The Voice of the Ancient Bard is a poem written by the English poet William Blake.  It was published as part of his collection Songs of Innocence in 1789, but later moved to Songs of Experience, the second part of the larger collection Songs of Innocence and of Experience, 1794.

Poem 
The following is a transcription of the poem:

Context and interpretation
The poem is not known in any draft or manuscript version. Initially it was a part of the Songs of Innocence and printed as verso to The Little Black Boy; however, in the latest issues it is commonly placed last, forming a connecting link with the Introduction to the Songs of Experience. But much later, only after 1818(!), it was moved into Songs of Experience and became a terminal poem of all the collection of the Songs.

Blake speaks here  as the Ancient Bard and the Prophet (who also appeared in the Introduction to the Songs of Experience), trying  “to reassure the ‘Youth of delight’ that the morning of regeneration is at hand, when the doubts and disputes of mortal life will be dispelled, even though many have fallen on the way.”

The illustration shows the Bard, a gowned bearded old man, playing a large celtic triangular harp to the listening youths and maidens: two children standing in the middle of the group, and six older youths.  There are two young females standing to the left who embrace. Two children and a group of three females stand to the right facing the bard. Another female at their feet, facing them, kneels on a grassy ground. The text above is decorated with leaves and vine.

Swinburne  was one of the first reviewers of the poem in his Critical essay (1868), speaking about Blake as a voice of the ancient bard, who “summons to judgment the young and single-spirited, that by right of the natural impulse of delight in them they may give sentence against the preachers of convention and assumption”. For him the initial placement of this poem at the end of the Songs of Innocence seems to be quite convincing, because in this case it serves as a natural prelude to the Songs of Experience and its Introduction, where the same bard is acting.

But most scholars point out the duality and ambiguity of the poem.  Stanley Gardner, stressing the double character and function of it in the collection of the Songs, notices that “the morning promise to the ‘youth of delight’, and the dispelling of doubt and despair, are accessories to Innocence: but the tone of the lines does not belong to the lightheartedness of true Innocence... Then in the last six lines the poem shifts towards Experience, identifying the ‘folly’ with perplexity among ‘roots’ that recollect ‘the forest of affliction’... and, in the end, a sense of regret is expressed that those who ‘wish to lead others’ are obsessed with selfish care...”

This ‘forest of affliction’ we encounter in the Song of Enitharmon from the poem Vala, or The Four Zoas:
 

However, there is another opinion introduced by E. D. Hirsch, Jr, that the poem “belongs neither to Innocence nor Experience”. He regards The Voice of the Ancient Bard as “Blake's first apocalyptic outburst,” a poem that “harks back to the Ossianic experiments in Poetical Sketches, but the tone is unlike anything in Blake's earlier poetry.”< So, this is a poem which anticipates later prophetic works. It is fundamentally different from the poems in the canon of Innocence as well as of Experience.  Here Blake addresses “neither child nor an adult, as in other poems, but a ‘youth’”. The new and better world is not a traditional Eden or the pastoral Heaven of theSongs of Innocence,  but “a repudiation of all the old traditions”, and its dawn is quite similar to that in A Song of Liberty (1793):

It is a significant fact that the poem is dated by 1789, the year of French Revolution, that “was the occasion for a radical change in Blake’s valuation of actual life”, and the reviewer sees this dawn,  though “ambiguous and unspecific”, as a prophecy  of “the dawn of an entirely spiritual and inward Jerusalem which prefigures the final, spiritual Eternity that will end time and death forever.”

Gallery

Musical settings
The poem has been set to various different musical scores:
 John Harbison (b.1938), USA: The Voice of the Ancient Bard, No. 4 from Five Songs of Experience, for 4 soli, SATB chorus, string quartet and percussions, 1971
 Gary Higginson (b.1952), UK: The Voice of the Ancient Bard, No. 7 from Seven Songs of Experience (set no. 2), for SATB, 1981-2
 Chester Edward Ide (1878—1944), USA:  The Voice of the Ancient Bard. No.8 from Songs of Innocence—Eight Poems by William Blake, for two treble voices a capella, 1928.
Joan Anne Littlejohn (b. 1937), UK:  The Voice of the Ancient Bard. No.1 from Songs of Experience (part II of Songs of Innocence and of Experience ), for voice and piano, 1967-70 
Leo Smith (1881–1952), Canada: The Voice of the Ancient Bard, for voice and piano, c. 1900 
 Tod Machover (b. 1953), USA: In the opera Skellig, 2008

Notes

Works cited

 A. C. Swinburne. William Blake, a critical essay (Chapter: Lyrical poems), 1868.

External links

A comparison of extant copies of Introduction (Songs of Experience): from the William Blake Archive.
 The Voice of the Ancient Bard on UGA Education

1794 poems
Songs of Innocence and of Experience